Spegatrine is an α1- and α2-adrenergic receptor antagonist isolated from Rauvolfia verticillata. Its dimer dispegatrine has greater antagonist affinity for α-adrenergic receptors.

See also
 Ajmalicine
 Corynanthine
 Rauwolscine
 Yohimbine

References

Alkaloids found in Rauvolfia
Alpha-1 blockers
Alpha-2 blockers
Tryptamine alkaloids
Indoloquinolizines